Wilfried Hannes (born 17 May 1957) is a German former professional footballer who played as a defender, and manager, known for achieving his career despite being visually impaired after a pupil-tumour had caused him to lose his sight in his right eye as a child.

Club career
Hannes was born in Düren-Echtz, Germany. At first a striker, he was a defender in his professional career for Borussia Mönchengladbach, he joined the club during the Bundesliga Championship and UEFA Cup winning season of 1975. He was a fan favourite and a crucial player, he went on to collect two more German Bundesliga titles in 1976 and 1977 and the UEFA Cup in 1979. In his years with the club he also helped them to European Cup runners-up in 1977, UEFA Cup runners-up in 1980 and German Cup runners-up in 1984.

As a sweeper Hannes was renowned for his forward surges and his long distance shots, many resulting in goals. He was also an accomplished header of the ball and his record of 58 goals in 261 games at Borussia Mönchengladbach speaks volumes for Hannes' technique and scoring abilities.

International career
His international career for West Germany lasted for just about one year in the early 1980s. In these months he won eight caps, three of them in the qualification for the 1982 FIFA World Cup. He went to the 1982 FIFA World Cup with West Germany and they came runners-up in the tournament but Hannes wasn't used on the pitch. The fact he only made eight appearances was more to do with the great defensive partnership of the Förster brothers at that time rather than his lack of ability.

Lothar Matthäus has been previously quoted has saying that during his early career at Borussia Mönchengladbach he learnt a lot from Wilfried Hannes whilst playing alongside him.

Coaching career
His career as manager includes spells at Alemannia Aachen (1991–1994) and other clubs of the size of fourth divisional outfits. Lately he coached SC Borussia 1912 Freialdenhoven in the fifth division.

Career statistics

Club

Honours
Borussia Mönchengladbach
 Bundesliga: 1975–76, 1976–77
 UEFA Cup: 1978–79

References

External links
 
 
 
 

1957 births
Living people
German footballers
Germany international footballers
Borussia Mönchengladbach players
FC Schalke 04 players
AC Bellinzona players
FC Aarau players
Bundesliga players
1982 FIFA World Cup players
German football managers
Alemannia Aachen managers
UEFA Cup winning players
Association football sweepers
Swiss Super League players
West German footballers
West German expatriate footballers
Expatriate footballers in Switzerland
West German expatriate sportspeople in Switzerland
People from Düren
Sportspeople from Cologne (region)
Footballers from North Rhine-Westphalia